Mwan (Mwa, Mouan, Muan, Muana, Mona) is a Mande language of Ivory Coast.

References

Mande languages
Languages of Ivory Coast